Katibasia insidiosa is a species of loach endemic to Sarawak, Malaysia.  It is the only species in its genus.

References

Gastromyzontidae
Monotypic fish genera
Fish of Asia
Fish described in 2004